Jonathan Sykes (born 9 March 1990) is a Bahamian international footballer who played college soccer in the USA for Maryville College as a midfielder.

Career
Sykes has played college soccer in the United States for Maryville College since 2008.

He made his international debut for Bahamas in 2011, and has appeared in FIFA World Cup qualifying matches.

References

External links
 Profile - Maryville College Athletics

1990 births
Living people
Bahamian footballers
Bahamas international footballers
Sportspeople from Nassau, Bahamas
Association football midfielders